The Journal of Law and Society is a quarterly peer-reviewed law journal which publishes papers in the field of the sociology of law. It was established in 1974 as the British Journal of Law and Society, obtaining its current name in 1982. It is published by John Wiley & Sons on behalf of the Cardiff School of Law and Politics. Since its founding, the journal's editor-in-chief has been Philip Thomas (Cardiff School of Law and Politics). According to the Journal Citation Reports, the journal has a 2017 impact factor of 0.714, ranking it 101st out of 150 journals in the category "Law" and 107th out of 147 journals in the category "sociology".

References

External links

British law journals
Publications established in 1974
Sociology journals
Sociology of law
Wiley (publisher) academic journals
Cardiff University
Academic journals associated with universities and colleges
English-language journals
Quarterly journals